ι Lyrae, Latinised as Iota Lyrae, is a binary star in the northern constellation of Lyra. It is visible to the naked eye as a dim, blue-white hued star with an apparent visual magnitude that fluctuates around 5.22. This object is located approximately 910 light years distant from the Sun based on parallax, but is drifting nearer with a radial velocity of −26 km/s. 

This is a wide binary system with a computed orbital period of 217 years and an eccentricity of 0.6. The primary component has a stellar classification of B6IV, matching a B-type subgiant star. The star ranges in brightness from magnitude 5.20 down to 5.27.

References

B-type subgiants
Be stars
Binary stars

Lyra (constellation)
Lyrae, Iota
Durchmusterung objects
Lyrae, 18
178475
093903
7262